Fredrik Haraldseth (born ) is a Norwegian male  cyclo-cross cyclist. He represented his nation in the men's elite event at the 2016 UCI Cyclo-cross World Championships  in Heusden-Zolder.

References

External links
 Profile at cyclingarchives.com

1992 births
Living people
Cyclo-cross cyclists
Norwegian male cyclists
Place of birth missing (living people)